Gabriela Masłowska (born 27 June 1950 in Batorz) is a Polish politician. She was elected to the Sejm on 25 September 2005, getting 11,977 votes in 6 Lublin district as a candidate from the League of Polish Families list.

She was also a member of Sejm 2001-2005.

See also
Members of Polish Sejm 2005-2007

References

External links
Gabriela Masłowska - parliamentary page - includes declarations of interest, voting record, and transcripts of speeches.

1950 births
Living people
Members of the Polish Sejm 2001–2005
Members of the Polish Sejm 2005–2007
Members of the Polish Sejm 2007–2011
Members of the Polish Sejm 2011–2015
Members of the Polish Sejm 2015–2019
Members of the Polish Sejm 2019–2023
Women members of the Sejm of the Republic of Poland
People from Janów Lubelski County
League of Polish Families politicians
21st-century Polish women politicians